The Big Savage Tunnel is a rail trail tunnel located about  southeast of Meyersdale, Pennsylvania. It, as well as the Pinkerton Tunnel, Borden Tunnel, and Brush Tunnel are part of the Great Allegheny Passage trail. It was originally built for the Connellsville subdivision of the Western Maryland Railway.

Origin of the name
The mountain and tunnel are named for John Savage, an early surveyor who narrowly avoided becoming a victim of cannibalism in the area in 1736. While he was surveying the land in the wintertime, the circumstances became dire and he offered himself up as food, but the rest of the survey party declined.

Renovated for Great Allegheny Passage bicycle trail
The tunnel was renovated for use on the Great Allegheny Passage rail trail.  It is the longest tunnel on the trail.

The tunnel is closed between roughly December 15 and April 10 each winter to protect it from icing damage.

References

External links

 Movie of trip through the tunnel (YouTube - large file)
 Map and description of tunnel - WMWestSub.com

Railroad tunnels in Pennsylvania
Transportation buildings and structures in Somerset County, Pennsylvania
Western Maryland Railway tunnels
Pedestrian tunnels in the United States